An overhead line crossing is the crossing of an obstacle—such as a traffic route, a river, a valley or a strait—by an overhead power line. The style of crossing depends on the local conditions and regulations at the time the power line is constructed. Overhead line crossings can sometimes require extensive construction and can also have operational issues. In such cases, those in charge of construction should consider whether a crossing of the obstacle would be better accomplished by an underground or submarine cable.

Crossings of roads and railway lines
Overhead line crossings of roads, railway lines, and small- and medium-sized watercourses do not normally require special construction. However, in the first years of overhead line building a scaffold under the line was required, when a railway line or a road was crossed. Later in Germany and some other countries on each end of a powerline crossing of a state-operated railway a dead-end tower was required, which can still be seen on some old power lines. For overhead line crossings of motorways the pylons must be rebuilt before they wear out, because these demand additional maintenance. If local conditions are appropriate, an overhead line can be implemented by way of a valley bridge. For example, the Koersch valley bridge near Esslingen, Germany carries the 110 kV, three-phase line of the EnBW AG with 2 circuits. Because of the danger of short circuits from falling objects, undercrossings are typically avoided.

Crossings of overhead lines at state borders

There is frequently an anchor pylon on each side of the border, particularly if the lines on either side of the border are operated by different companies.  This setup reduces maintenance work, which would otherwise require direct coordination of workers on both sides of the border, and avoids possible authority problems associated with border crossings as much as possible.

Crossings of other overhead lines

At crossings of overhead lines by other overhead lines, the two lines must be kept at the necessary safety distances between the lines and the ground. As a rule, the line with the lower voltage passes under the line with higher voltage.  Construction workers try to plan these crossings in such a way that their construction is as economical as possible. This is usually done by leaving unchanged the line that is crossed, if possible. Undercrossings of existing lines are often constructed in proximity to the line's pylons, since this can often be accomplished without raising the existing pylons and while keeping the necessary safety distances between the ground and the other line.

In the course of undercrossings the pylon picture is frequently changed, and because of its small height it is preferable to create an arrangement with conductors in one level. Sometimes at such crossings there can be problems because of the maximum pylon height allowed for flight safety reasons. If it is not possible at a given location for the pylons of the upper line to be built at a necessary height, the line running below it will be rebuilt on smaller pylons or replaced with an underground cable.

A unique undercrossing of two powerlines can be found north of Kincardine at Scotland at 56°5'17"N   3°43'11"W. Here crosses the powerline Kincardine-Tealing two other lines. One of the two circuits of Kincardine-Tealing powerline crosses these lines on two small pylons and the other circuit via an underground cable.

Special crossings from overhead lines of other overhead lines 

There are some crossings between two overhead powerlines, which are unique, either as both lines are of special type or the unique way of implementation

Overhead line crossings of aerial tramways
Overhead lines should cross the route of an aerial tramway only above it, if at all.

The necessary protection distances from overhead lines to the ropes of an aerial tramway are subject to regulations concerning the construction of aerial tramways and overhead lines. In the case of an undercrossing of an aerial tramway, the maximum safety distances between the overhead line and the floor of the aerial tramway cab must be followed absolutely.

In principle, over- and undercrossings of aerial tramways are completely regulated. However, frequently at the range of the crossing section, special precautionary measures are taken.  Thus, at overhead line crossings at which the overhead line runs above the rope of the aerial tramway, two catch ropes are occasionally installed to prevent the conductor from falling off the rope of the tramway in case a pylon or insulator were to break.  Alternatively, auxiliary cross-bars can be installed on the pylons of the overhead line under the conductors, which prevent the conductor cables from falling in case of an insulator failure on the aerial tramway. Occasionally, the span field of the line over the aerial ropeway can be scaffolded with a rigid construction along its whole length, or at least for the span which crosses the aerial tramway.

At crossings at which the aerial tramway runs above the power line, the line is frequently installed on special masts in the crossing range, which scaffold the line in the area of the aerial tramway crossing. Such a measure is not necessary according to power line regulations, but it is often done because, in case of aerial tramway failure, it is possible to rescue people from the tram without switching off the overhead line. Such constructions may be seen at 110 kV power line crossings of the Penkenbahn at Mayrhofen, the Patscherkofelbahn at Innsbruck and south of Zermatt.

Overhead line crossings of broad rivers and straits

Overhead line crossings of broad rivers and of straits, if the terrain on both sides is relatively even, frequently consist of four pylons: two particularly substantial anchor pylons for bracing the conductors of the crossing section, and two tall carrying masts to keep the line high over the water. These pylons have broader cross-bars and greater distances between the cross-bars than the other pylons of the line, in order to prevent the conductor cables from striking against each other during strong winds. In contrast to normal pylons, the two carrying masts at both ends of the crossing are frequently equipped with flight safety lamps, and have stairways for easy access to the top.

Overhead line crossings of rivers and straits with spans of over 2 km are frequently prohibitively expensive to build and operate; because of the danger of wind-induced oscillatory movements of the conductor cables, it is necessary either to install very large leader distances or to mount insulators between the conductors in the area of the span. Bundle conductors, which are used for almost all extra-high voltage lines, are more susceptible to oscillations from wind forces than single conductors. Therefore, single conductors must be used for the crossing section, which means the crossing section of the power line determines the maximum transmittable power.

Further, one cannot build pylons arbitrarily high at either end of the crossing section, and there is a usually a considerable minimum height because of ships crossing under the line, so there is often a high mechanical tension in the conductors at long spans. This tension requires conductors made largely of steel, which have a worse electrical conductivity than the common overhead line conductors consisting of copper, Aldrey or aluminum-encased steel, and also limits the amount of transmittable electrical power. For this reason, for crossings with a span width of more than approximately 2 km, those in charge of construction should consider laying an underwater cable as the more practicable solution.

Alternatively, it might be possible to erect one or more pylons in the water to be crossed. Such crossings can be seen occasionally in North America. They are, however, only used when it is more economical and practical to do so than to lay a cable underwater, such as when the water is not very deep and no large passage heights are needed for vessels. Also, such construction can be very problematic as far as getting legal permission to build, because pylons standing in the water are likely to be considered dangerous obstacles for ships, especially in foggy conditions.

In some cases on bridges small crossing a wider waterway pylons or crossbars for the conductors can be mounted. Such a solution, which may lead to safety problems at bridge maintenance, was for example realized at the Danish Storstrøm Bridge.

It is quite likely that overhead line crossings of broad waters can be replaced with underwater cables. The overhead line crossing the Strait of Messina — which, with a span of 3646 meters, was  one of the longest overhead line crossings in the world, with 200-meter pylons among the highest in the world — was replaced by a submarine cable, because of its small maximum transmittable electrical power.

Overhead line crossing of valleys
Overhead line crossings of valleys consist of two anchor pylons, one at either end of the valley. If the topography of the valley is suitable, these do not need to be very high.  In very wide valleys, it is better to use a pylon for each phase in order to achieve sufficient distance between the conductors. In these cases there is frequently a further anchor pylon behind the crossing, used in order to realize the angle change of the conductor cables behind these. The problems associated with large spans also exist in these cases, but these can be easily and economically ameliorated, if the topography does not require high crossing pylons, by using a separate pylon for each conductor.

Structures
A crossing pylon is used for crossing over a body of water or a valley.  Due to the long span, crossing pylons across rivers and sea straits are frequently taller than standard pylons. They may have marking lamps, and unlike standard pylons, often have stairways for easy access to the top.  In many cases, their height makes them ideal for carrying radio antennas and transmitting equipment.

Crossing pylons for valleys, depending on the local topography, are not necessarily tall, but the distance between the conducting cables must be sufficient to prevent high winds knocking the conductors into one another; these pylons have wide crossbars to prevent this.  For very long spans each phase has a separate pylon, particularly if the pylons are short.

Special crossing pylons are often used where aerial tramways cross power lines. These pylons are designed with integral scaffolding so that the tramway cars can be reached without touching a live power line.  This enables passengers to be rescued from the tramway if it fails without cutting the power from the power line.  Such installations can be found, for example, south of Zermatt, Switzerland; at the Patscherkofelbahn near Innsbruck, Austria; and at the Penkenbahn in Mayrhofen, Austria.

See also
 List of spans

References
This article draws heavily on the corresponding article in the German-language Wikipedia.

Electric power infrastructure
Spans (architecture)